The flank or latus is the side of the body between the rib cage and the iliac bone of the hip (below the rib cage and above the ilium).

It is sometimes called the lumbar region.

References

Abdomen